Klodian Asllani (born 2 August 1977) is an Albanian retired football player.

Club career
The striker had several spells with Dinamo Tirana in Albanian superliga.

References

1977 births
Living people
People from Kuçovë
Albanian footballers
Association football forwards
FK Tomori Berat players
FK Dinamo Tirana players
KF Vllaznia Shkodër players
KF Elbasani players
KS Kastrioti players
KF Apolonia Fier players
FK Partizani Tirana players
KF Skënderbeu Korçë players